Baroness Kathleen Annie Pannonica de Koenigswarter (née Rothschild; 10 December 1913 – 30 November 1988) was a British-born jazz patron and writer. A leading patron of bebop, she was a member of the Rothschild family.

Personal life

Kathleen Annie Pannonica Rothschild was born in December 1913, in London, the youngest daughter of Charles Rothschild and his wife, Hungarian baroness Rózsika Edle von Wertheimstein, daughter of Baron Alfred von Wertheimstein of Bihar County. She was born into a branch of the wealthiest family in the world at the time. Her paternal grandfather was Nathan Rothschild, 1st Baron Rothschild. She grew up in Tring Park Mansion as well as Waddesdon Manor, among other family houses. The name "Pannonica" (shortened to "Nica" as a nickname) derives from Eastern Europe's Pannonian plain. Her friend Thelonious Monk reported that she was named after a species of butterfly her father had discovered, although her great-niece has found that the source of the name is a rare species of moth, Eublemma pannonica. She was a niece of Walter Rothschild, the 2nd Baron Rothschild, and her brother Victor Rothschild became the 3rd Baron Rothschild. Her elder sister was the zoologist and author Dame Miriam Rothschild.

In 1935, she married French diplomat Baron Jules de Koenigswarter, later a Free French hero. In 1937, they bought and moved to the Château d'Abondant, a 17th-century château in north-west France they acquired from the family of American banker Henry Herman Harjes (who had acquired the château in 1920 from the Duchesse de Vallombrosa). She worked for Charles de Gaulle during World War II. The couple, who had five children, separated in 1951, and she left the family and moved to New York City, renting a suite at The Stanhope Hotel. As a result of their separation, Koenigswarter was disinherited by her family, the Rothschilds. The couple eventually divorced in 1956. In 1958, she purchased a house in Weehawken, New Jersey with a Manhattan skyline view, originally built for film director Josef von Sternberg.

Koenigswarter died of heart failure in 1988, aged 74, at the Columbia-Presbyterian Medical Center, in New York City. She had five children, two grandchildren, and four great-grandchildren.

Participation in the Free French Army 
She joined the Free French Army to fight against Nazi Germany during World War II. She had refused to participate in the North African Campaign, but she joined clandestinely to fight alongside her husband.  The war imposed a suspension of her marital and family duties but she managed to send her children from France to America, secretly moving across continents. She served as a decoder, ambulance driver, and radio host for the Free French. At the close of the war she was decorated as a lieutenant by the allied armies.

Jazz
In New York, de Koenigswarter became a friend and patron of leading jazz musicians, hosting jam sessions in her hotel suite, often driving them in her Bentley when they needed a lift to gigs, as well as sometimes helping them to pay rent, buy groceries, and making hospital visits. Although not a musician herself, she is sometimes referred to as the "bebop baroness" or "jazz baroness" because of her patronage of Thelonious Monk and Charlie Parker among others. Following Parker's death in her Stanhope rooms in 1955, de Koenigswarter was asked to leave by the hotel management; she re-located to the Bolivar Hotel at 230 Central Park West, a building commemorated in Thelonious Monk's 1956 composition "Ba-lue Bolivar Ba-lues-are".

She was introduced to Thelonious Monk by jazz pianist/composer Mary Lou Williams in Paris while attending the "Salon du Jazz 1954". She championed his work in the United States, writing the liner notes for his 1962 Columbia album Criss-Cross. She even took criminal responsibility when she and Monk were charged with marijuana possession by Delaware police in 1958, spending a few nights in jail. De Koenigswarter was sentenced to three years in prison. After a two-year legal battle that was financed by her family, the case was dismissed in a court of appeals on a technicality.

She was a regular visitor to many of New York's jazz clubs, including the Five Spot Café, Village Vanguard, Birdland, and Small's. In 1957, she bought a new piano for the Five Spot because she thought the existing one was not good enough for Monk's performances there. During the 1950s, she was licensed as a manager by the American Federation of Musicians. Her clients included Horace Silver, Hank Mobley, Sir Charles Thompson, and The Jazz Messengers.

After Monk ended his public performances in the mid-1970s, he retired to de Koenigswarter's house in Weehawken, New Jersey, where he died in 1982.

She used her wealth to pay for the funerals and burial grounds for several jazz musician friends, including Bud Powell, Sonny Clark and Coleman Hawkins.

Dedications
The San Francisco art rock band Oxbow released a recording entitled "Pannonica" (unrelated to the Thelonious Monk composition) with reissues of their 1991 album King of the Jews. A famous jazz club in Nantes, France, is called "Le Pannonica".

Literature
De Koenigswarter (Nica) appears prominently in "El perseguidor", a one-hundred page story by Julio Cortázar in the book Las armas secretas (The Secret Weapons, 1959). The latter four stories of this book appeared in translation in the volume Blow-up and Other Stories (alternatively titled The End of the Game and Other Stories); "El perseguidor", "The Pursuer", is a homage to Charlie Parker.

In October 2006, the French company Buchet Chastel published de Koenigswarter's book Les musiciens de jazz et leurs trois vœux ("The jazz musicians and their three wishes"). Compiled between 1961 and 1966, it is a book of interviews with 300 musicians who told her what their "three wishes" would be, and is accompanied by her Polaroid photographs. The book was edited for publication by Nadine de Koenigswarter, whom Nica always introduced to people as her granddaughter but who was in fact her great-niece. An English-language version was published in 2008 as Three Wishes: An Intimate Look at Jazz Greats.

Her photographs were exhibited in 2007 at the Rencontres d'Arles festival.

Media depictions

Film
Nica was played by Diane Salinger in the Clint Eastwood biographical film Bird (1988) about Charlie "Bird" Parker. In the Eastwood-produced documentary film Thelonious Monk: Straight, No Chaser (1988) she is seen in library footage and heard in an interview.

Television
In April 2009, a television portrait entitled The Jazz Baroness, written and directed by her great-niece Hannah Rothschild, was broadcast on the television channel BBC Four and repeated on 19 February 2012. It was broadcast in the US by HBO on 25 November 2009. A radio documentary by Rothschild of Nica, The Jazz Baroness, was broadcast on BBC Radio 4 on 12 February 2008. Rothschild has also written the biography detailed below.

Biographies
 Hannah Rothschild, The Baroness: The Search for Nica the Rebellious Rothschild (2012)
 David Kastin, Nica's Dream: The Life and Legend of the Jazz Baroness (2011)

References

Further reading
Kastin, David (2006). "Nica's Story: the Life and Legend of the Jazz Baroness", Popular Music & Society, Volume 29, Number 3, July 2006, pp. 279–298.
Montgomery-Massingberd, Hugh (1996), The Daily Telegraph Book of Obituaries: a Celebration of Eccentric Lives.  London: Pan.
"La baronne du jazz" - La vraie vie de légende de Pannonica de Koenigswarter by Stéphane Tamaillon and Priscilla Horviller (2020, French)

External links 

1913 births
1988 deaths
English Jews
Daughters of barons
People from the Upper East Side
People from Weehawken, New Jersey
Rothschild family
Charlie Parker
Thelonious Monk
English people of German-Jewish descent
English people of Hungarian-Jewish descent
Writers from London
English patrons of music
Jewish women philanthropists
British expatriates in the United States